The Handler may refer to:

The Handler (TV series), a TV series
The Handler (album), a 2004 album by Har Mar Superstar
"The Handler" (song), a 2015 song by Muse
The Handler, a character from the Netflix adaptation of The Umbrella Academy.